Bennefield Branch is a  long 1st order tributary to the Leipsic River in Kent County, Delaware.

Course
Bennefield Branch rises on the Finis Branch divide about 0.5 miles west of Whitehall Crossroads, Delaware.  Bennefield Branch then flows south to meet the Leipsic River about 0.5 miles northwest of Leipsic.

Watershed
Bennefield Branch drains  of area, receives about 45.1 in/year of precipitation, has a topographic wetness index of 684.33 and is about 0% forested.

References

Rivers of Delaware
Rivers of Kent County, Delaware
Tributaries of the Leipsic River